Yolande River is a river that starts in the West Coast Range, Western Tasmania, that drains Lake Margaret, is utilised by the Lake Margaret Power Station and is a tributary to the Henty River, west of Queenstown

Notes

Rivers of Tasmania
Western Tasmania